Čeplez is a small settlement in the hills east of Cerkno in the traditional Littoral region of Slovenia.

References

External links

Čeplez on Geopedia

Populated places in the Municipality of Cerkno